Dare 2 Dance is an Indian reality television show which began on Life OK from 6 September 2014. The show is hosted by the Bollywood actor Akshay Kumar.

Contestants
Alisha Singh
Prince
Rithvik Dhanjani
Mayuresh Wadkar
Scarlett
Sanam Johar (winner)
Emillie (2nd place)
Sayantani Ghosh
Kunwar Amar (3rd place)
Karan Pangali
Mayuri Bhandari (wild card entry)

References

External links
 on Hotstar

2014 Indian television series debuts